The Sebasticook River is a  river in the central part of Maine, in the United States. From its source in Dexter, the upper "Main Stream" section flows generally west and south  to Great Moose Lake. From the outlet of the lake in Hartland, the Sebasticook flows 
south to the Kennebec River in Winslow.

According to the Sebasticook Regional Land Trust:
The Sebasticook River is the largest tributary (985 square miles) to the Kennebec and thus plays an important role in the restoration of both the anadromous and resident aquatic fisheries of the Kennebec basin and the Gulf of Maine ecosystem. Due to its relatively close proximity to the lower Kennebec, large drainage area, and low gradient, this watershed historically contributed a major percentage of available spawning and nursery habitat for anadromous runs of alewife, blueback herring, American shad, rainbow smelt, and striped bass associated with the Kennebec River watershed and Gulf of Maine ecosystems. To a lesser extent, the river provided habitat for Atlantic salmon.

Great Moose Lake

Great Moose Lake (formerly known as Moose Pond) is the second-largest lake in the Sebasticook River watershed, and the largest on the main stem of the river. The lake is a good habitat for smallmouth bass, white perch, chain pickerel, and rainbow smelt. Lake tributaries Black Stream, Wichee Brook, Brown Brook, Higgins Brook, Goodwin Brook, and Little Ferguson Brook provide smelt spawning habitat. Despite marginal summer conditions of warm surface waters and low dissolved oxygen concentrations below the  thermocline, the Maine Department of Inland Fisheries and Wildlife has attempted to stock the lake with salmon.

See also
List of rivers of Maine

References

External links
Sebasticook Regional Land Trust

Tributaries of the Kennebec River
Rivers of Kennebec County, Maine
Rivers of Penobscot County, Maine
Rivers of Piscataquis County, Maine
Rivers of Somerset County, Maine
Rivers of Waldo County, Maine
North Maine Woods
Winslow, Maine
Dexter, Maine
Pittsfield, Maine
Rivers of Maine